Door lock may refer to:

Automotive 
 an automobile's door lock, which may include a remote

Film 
 Door Lock (film), a 2018 South Korean film directed by Lee Kwon

Household and commercial uses 
 a deadbolt lock
 a door chain
 a locking door handle
 an electromagnetic lock, which holds a door shut when electricity is supplied to it
 a keycard lock, commonly used on hotel doors
 a mortise lock, a lock installed in a hollowed-out pocket within a door
 a rim lock, a lock fixed to the exterior of the door

See also 
 Door security
 Lock and key